Escape from L.A. (stylized on-screen as John Carpenter's Escape from L.A.) is a 1996 American post-apocalyptic action film co-written, co-scored, and directed by John Carpenter, co-written and produced by Debra Hill and Kurt Russell, with Russell also starring as Snake Plissken. A sequel to Escape from New York (1981), Escape from L.A. co-stars Steve Buscemi, Stacy Keach, Bruce Campbell, Peter Fonda, and Pam Grier. Escape from L.A. failed to meet the studio's expectations at the box office, and received polarized reactions from critics. The film later found a strong cult following.

Plot
In 2000, a massive earthquake strikes the city of Los Angeles, cutting it off from the mainland as the San Fernando Valley floods. Declaring that God is punishing Los Angeles for its sins, a theocratic presidential candidate wins election to a lifetime term of office. He orders the United States capital relocated from Washington, D.C. to his hometown of Lynchburg, Virginia and enacts a series of strict morality laws. Violators are given a choice between loss of U.S. citizenship and permanent deportation to the new Los Angeles Island, or repentance and death by electrocution. Escape from the island is made impossible due to a containment wall erected along the mainland shore and a heavy federal police presence monitoring the area.

By 2013, the U.S. has developed a superweapon known as the "Sword of Damocles," a satellite system capable of targeting electronic devices anywhere in the world and rendering them useless. The president intends to use it to dominate the world by destroying hostile nations' ability to function. His daughter Utopia steals the remote control for the system and escapes to Los Angeles Island in order to deliver it to Cuervo Jones, a Peruvian Shining Path revolutionary. Cuervo has marshaled an invasion force of third world nations and is planning to attack and reclaim the U.S.

Facing deportation for a series of crimes, Snake Plissken is offered a chance to earn a pardon by traveling to the island and recovering the remote, a task that a previous rescue team failed to accomplish. To force his compliance, the president has one of his officers infect Snake with a virus that will kill him within 10 hours and promises that he will receive the cure upon completing the mission. The president is not concerned with Utopia's safety, regarding her as a traitor.

Snake is issued equipment and sent to Los Angeles in a one-man submarine. As he explores the island, he meets "Map to the Stars" Eddie, a swindler who sells interactive tours and one of Cuervo's associates. Along the way, Snake is helped by Pipeline, a surfing enthusiast; Taslima, a woman deported for her Muslim faith; and Hershe Las Palmas (formerly Carjack Malone), a trans woman and past criminal associate of Snake's.

Eddie captures Snake and turns him over to Cuervo, who uses the Sword of Damocles to shut down Lynchburg in retaliation for Snake's presence. Cuervo threatens to inflict the same fate on the rest of the U.S. unless his demands are met. Snake escapes, and teams up with Hershe and her soldiers. The group travels by glider to the invasion staging area, at the "Happy Kingdom" in Anaheim. During a fight against Cuervo's troops, Snake takes the remote and Eddie alters the one for his tours to match it. Snake, Eddie, Utopia, Hershe, and a group of Hershe's soldiers escape the island in a helicopter. Eddie shoots Cuervo, who fires a rocket launcher and hits the helicopter before dying. Eddie jumps clear at liftoff, and Snake and Utopia do the same over the mainland and leave the helicopter to crash once Snake alerts the president to their approach.

At the crash site, the president and his officers find that both Snake and Utopia are carrying remotes and take the one held by Utopia (slipped into her pocket without her noticing), thinking that Snake has switched them. As Utopia is taken to the electric chair, Snake learns that the virus infecting him only causes a severe case of influenza that subsides within hours. The president tries to use Utopia's remote to neutralize an invasion force threatening Florida, but it only plays a recorded introduction to one of Eddie's tours.

Furious, the president orders his officers to kill Snake on the spot, but he proves to be only a hologram projected from a miniature camera that had been issued to him. Disgusted at the world's never-ending class warfare, he programs the real remote and triggers every satellite in the Sword of Damocles system, deactivating all technology on Earth. Utopia is saved when the power fails just before she can be electrocuted. Snake tosses the now-useless camera aside and lights a cigarette, then blows out the match and mutters, "Welcome to the human race."

Cast

Production

Escape from L.A. was in development for over 10 years. In 1987, screenwriter Coleman Luck was commissioned to write a screenplay for the film with Dino De Laurentiis's company producing, which Carpenter later described as being "too light, too campy". Eventually, Carpenter and Kurt Russell met together to write with their long-time collaborator Debra Hill. Carpenter insists that Russell's persistence allowed the film to be made, since "Snake Plissken was a character he loved and wanted to play again." Carpenter credited that same enthusiasm with motivating Russell's work on the script, declaring “I used his passion to do the movie to get him to write more”.

Filming 
Carpenter has described Escape from L.A. as both "fun to make" and requiring "months of nights" of work. Carpenter would later recall that the theme park scene, shot at night on a Universal backlot, resulted in a noise complaint from Rick Dees which forced them to cease using live ammunition. CG supervisor David Jones has expressed his distaste for the resulting effects used in the battle, which he described as "a little iffy". Although uncredited, Tony Hawk has claimed that he and fellow professional skateboarder Chris Miller worked as stunt doubles for Peter Fonda and Kurt Russell during the surfing scene. Several scenes were shot in Carson, including the Sunset Boulevard and freeway sequences. The Sunset Boulevard scene was filmed in a landfill, where production staff constructed over 120 structures to create a shanty town. To create the impression of a crowded post-apocalyptic freeway, 250 broken cars were sourced from a junkyard in Ventura.

Music

Soundtrack

 "Dawn" – Stabbing Westward
 "Sweat" – Tool
 "The One" – White Zombie
 "Cut Me Out" – Toadies
 "Pottery" – Butthole Surfers
 "10 Seconds Down" – Sugar Ray
 "Blame (L.A. Remix)" – Gravity Kills
 "Professional Widow" – Tori Amos
 "Paisley" – Ministry
 "Fire in the Hole" – Orange 9mm
 "Escape from the Prison Planet" – Clutch
 "Et Tu Brute?" – CIV
 "Foot on the Gas" – Sexpod
 "Can't Even Breathe" – Deftones

Score

The film's score has been released twice, the first on both CD and cassette by Milan Records in 1996 and again as an expanded CD release by specialty label La-La Land Records in 2014 that featured pieces of music that were recorded for but ultimately cut from the film.

Release

Home media
Escape from L.A. was initially released on DVD in the United States on December 15, 1998, and later reissued on September 26, 2017.

The film was released on Blu-ray by Paramount on May 4, 2010. In 2020, Shout! Factory released a new 4K restoration on Blu-ray. In 2022, the 4K restoration was released on 4K Blu-ray. Upon its release, an English audio encoding error was noted by several reviewers, prompting Paramount to correct the issue in unreleased discs and launch a replacement program for initial purchasers.

Reception

Box office
Escape from L.A. grossed $25,477,365 from its $50 million budget, about as much as its predecessor but little more than half its significantly higher budget.

Critical response
The film received mixed reviews and has a 53% approval rating from Rotten Tomatoes based on 57 reviews, with an average score of 5.6/10. The site's consensus reads: "Escape from L.A. has its moments, although it certainly suffers in comparison to the cult classic that preceded it". Roger Ebert gave the film three-and-a-half stars out of a possible four and wrote that the movie felt it was an attempt to satirize the genre while exploiting it: "[Escape from L.A.] has such manic energy, such a weird, cockeyed vision, that it may work on some moviegoers as satire and on others as the real thing."

Todd McCarthy of Variety wrote, "A cartoonish, cheesy, and surprisingly campy apocalyptic actioner, John Carpenter's Escape From L.A. is spiked with a number of funny and anarchic ideas, but doesn't begin to pull them together into a coherent whole." Owen Gleiberman of Entertainment Weekly rated it C+ and wrote, "Carpenter never was the filmmaker his cult claimed him to be, but in Escape From L.A., he at least has the instinct to keep his hero moving, like some leather-biker Candide." Stephen Holden of The New York Times wrote that the film's in-jokes "go a long way toward keeping afloat a hopelessly choppy adventure spoof that doesn't even to try to match the ghoulish surrealism of its forerunner."

Kevin Thomas of the Los Angeles Times wrote, "With much humor and high adventure, John Carpenter's Escape From L.A. brilliantly imagines a Dante-esque vision of the City of Angels." Peter Stack of The San Francisco Chronicle rated it 3/4 stars and called it "dark, percussive and perversely fun." Esther Iverem of The Washington Post wrote that the film "tries but fails to be an action-hero flick or even a parody of one." Marc Savlov of The Austin Chronicle rated it 3/5 stars and wrote, "Loud, rollicking, alternately ultraviolent and hilarious, Escape from L.A. is Snake redux, and what more do you need, really?" Nigel Floyd of Time Out London wrote, "After 15 years of computer-generated effects, apocalyptic sci-fi and Arnie movies with flippant kiss-off lines, the sequel feels hackneyed and pointless." Kim Newman of Empire rated it 2/5 stars and wrote, "Apart from a few good characters, this is really not up to scratch in most departments especially the ludicrous plot."

In a 2013 retrospective, Alan Zilberman of The Atlantic called Snake Plissken "a pro-nostalgia antihero, disgusted by the world around him." While contrasting the film's then-futuristic plot elements against modern-day reality, Zilberman writes that the film's ending is more profound today, as Plissken would be annoyed by our fascination with technology, citing the example of two friends who ignore each other while transfixed with their smart phones.

John Carpenter later reflected:
Escape from L.A. is better than the first movie. Ten times better. It's got more to it. It's more mature. It's got a lot more to it. I think some people didn't like it because they felt it was a remake, not a sequel... I suppose it's the old question of whether you like Rio Bravo or El Dorado better? They're essentially the same movie. They both had their strengths and weaknesses. I don't know–you never know why a movie's going to make it or not. People didn't want to see Escape that time, but they really didn't want to see The Thing... You just wait. You've got to give me a little while. People will say, you know, what was wrong with me?

He reiterated his statement in another interview: "It is a better movie. It didn’t do what the first one did for some reason. Maybe it was too dark, too nihilistic. I don’t know. They didn’t dig it as much as the first one. It did okay, but it just wasn’t a hit."

About the cult following, Carpenter said: “I’m just delighted that it’s gaining that popularity. I really dig Escape from L.A., and I always have.“

Other media

Escape from Earth
A sequel of the movie called Escape from Earth was meant to be produced after Escape from L.A. but the underperformance of the latter changed the plans. According to John Carpenter, Escape from Earth would have picked up with Snake Plissken right after the ending of Escape from L.A., which saw him activating a superweapon known as the Sword of Damocles: “Escape from Earth was kind of Snake Plissken in a space capsule, flying interstellar. So there’d be a lot of special effects in it. Which I never care about too much. But that’s what it would look like.”

Comic books
Marvel Comics released the one-shot The Adventures of Snake Plissken in January 1997. The story takes place sometime between Escape from New York and his famous Cleveland escape mentioned in Escape from L.A.. Snake has robbed Atlanta's Centers for Disease Control of some engineered metaviruses and is looking for buyers in Chicago. Finding himself in a deal that's really a set-up, he makes his getaway and exacts revenge on the buyer for ratting him out to the United States Police Force. In the meantime, a government lab has built a robot called ATACS (Autonomous Tracking And Combat System) that can catch criminals by imprinting their personalities upon its program in order to predict and anticipate a specific criminal's every move. The robot's first test subject is Snake. After a brief battle, ATACS copies Snake to the point of fully becoming his personality. Now recognizing the government as the enemy, ATACS sides with Snake. Snake punches the machine and destroys it, reasoning, "I don't need the competition."

Cancelled video game
An Escape from L.A. video game was announced for the Sega Saturn, Sony PlayStation, Panasonic M2, and PC in 1996, but was later cancelled.

References

External links

 
 
 
 
 Escape from L.A. at theofficialjohncarpenter.com

1996 films
1996 independent films
1990s dystopian films
1990s satirical films
1990s science fiction action films
American independent films
American satirical films
American science fiction action films
American sequel films
American dystopian films
American post-apocalyptic films
Urban survival films
Snake Plissken Chronicles
Films directed by John Carpenter
Films produced by Debra Hill
Films set in 2000
Films set in 2013
Films set in Los Angeles
Films set in the future
Films shot in Los Angeles
Films shot in Texas
Films shot in New Braunfels, Texas
Films about fictional presidents of the United States
Films set in Orange County, California
Films with screenplays by John Carpenter
Films with screenplays by Debra Hill
Films scored by Shirley Walker
Films scored by John Carpenter
Rysher Entertainment films
Paramount Pictures films
1990s English-language films
1990s American films